The lined firetail skink (Morethia ruficauda) is a species of skink found in Northern Territory, Western Australia and South Australia in Australia.

References

Morethia
Reptiles described in 1895
Skinks of Australia
Endemic fauna of Australia
Taxa named by Arthur Henry Shakespeare Lucas
Taxa named by Charles Frost (naturalist)